Schloss Favorite is a schloss on the outskirts of Rastatt-Förch in Baden-Württemberg, Germany.

History
Built by Johann Michael Ludwig Rohrer between 1710 and 1730, it was created as a hunting lodge and maison de plaisance (pleasure palace) for Margravine Sibylla Augusta, the widow of Louis William, Margrave of Baden-Baden (Türkenlouis). It was only used for several weeks per year as a summer residence, and it is not far from Schloss Rastatt.

Schloss Favorite houses a large  collection of Chinese porcelain, black lacquerwork and Schwartz Porcelain. It is the oldest of the German so-called "porcelain palaces", and the only one to survive intact to this day.

Gallery

See also 
 List of Baroque residences

Sources
Sigrid Gensichen/Ulrike Grimm, Schloss Favorite Rastatt-Förch. Verlag K. F. Schimper, 2001,

External links 

 Schloss Favorite - official website
 German local history website
 German walkers website: Schloss Favorite, Baden's Rokoko Pearl

Palaces in Baden-Württemberg
Royal residences in Baden-Württemberg
Baroque architecture in Baden-Württemberg
Baroque palaces in Germany
Gardens in Baden-Württemberg
Historic house museums in Baden-Württemberg
Ceramics museums in Germany